Jacobus Mattheüs de Kempenaer  (6 July 1793 – 12 February 1870) was a Dutch politician and lawyer who served as Chairman of the Council of Ministers from November 1848 to November 1849. He served as a member of the House of Representatives, chairman of the board of Commerce for Arnhem, a member of the city board, and a member of the Provincial States of Gelderland.

Initially in the House of Representatives, de Kempenaer was considered a liberal. In 1844, he was among nine men to propose amending the Constitution of the Netherlands. De Kempenaer was appointed to the Constitution Commission headed by Johan Rudolph Thorbecke in 1848, and as Minister of the Interior. He soon became de facto Prime Minister, playing an important role in the revision of the national Constitution. He resigned his offices in 1849 and subsequently became a conservative, opposing Thorbecke.

Family
De Kempenaer was married in Haarlem on 19 August 1818 to Arnoldina Jacoba Gerlings (1796–1871). They had three sons and three daughters.

References 
 Nederland's Patriciaat, 39 ('s-Gravenhage 1953), 155. NP
 

1793 births
1870 deaths
Dutch members of the Dutch Reformed Church
Leiden University alumni 
Members of the House of Representatives (Netherlands)
Ministers of the Interior of the Netherlands
Lawyers from Amsterdam

People from Arnhem 
Prime Ministers of the Netherlands
Politicians from Amsterdam